Dimson is a small village in Cornwall, England. According to the Post Office, at the 2011 census population details were included in the civil parish of Calstock.

References

Villages in Cornwall